The men's coxless pairs was a rowing event held as part of the Rowing at the 1904 Summer Olympics programme.  It was the first time the event was held at the Olympics. The competition was held on Saturday, July 30, 1904. Three crews with six rowers, all from the United States, competed.

Results

References

Sources
 

Rowing at the 1904 Summer Olympics